Tajogaite or Tajogaite Volcano is a monogenetic volcano located in the municipality of El Paso on the island of La Palma, Canary Islands. It originated in the eruption that began on September 19, 2021, the most recent on the island and in the national terrestrial geography. It stopped on December 13, 2021, after 85 days of activity, being the longest historical eruption recorded on the island and third in the archipelago.

Name
Tajogaite is the name given to an area of the island of La Palma belonging to the municipality of El Paso and located south of Los Romanciaderos, close to Montaña Rajada. The toponym appears frequently from the 18th century on in local records linked to land ownership, however its use dates back to times when the Benahoarites inhabited the island.

References

La Palma
Volcanoes of the Canary Islands
Monogenetic cinder cones